Neptis sappho, the Pallas' sailer or common glider, is a nymphalid butterfly found in Central Europe, Russia, India and other parts of temperate Asia and Japan.

The wingspan is 40–46 mm.

The larvae feed on Lathyrus vernus, Lathyrus niger and Robinia pseudoacacia.

References

sappho
Butterflies of Asia
Butterflies of Indochina
Butterflies of Europe
Butterflies described in 1771